= Shen Hsin-Ling =

Taiwan philanthropist and peace activist

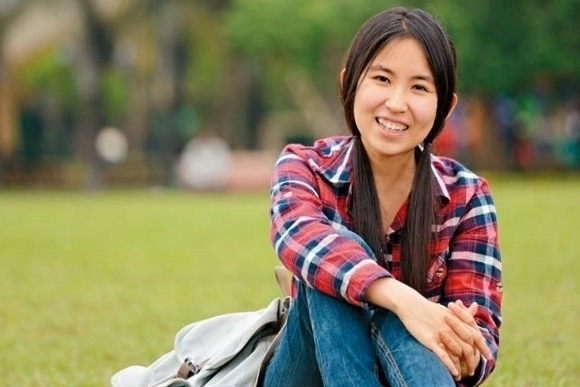

Dr. Shen Hsin-Ling (born 1989), Shen Hsin-Ling is a charity activist from Taiwan known for her work in setting up websites to help farmers to sell their products and free educational websites for students. Shen received the Presidential Education Award in Taiwan in July 2011 and she was named one of the Ten Outstanding Young People in October 2010. She received the Presidential Innovation Award in 2016 and twice received the Presidential Education Award.
